"Vampire's Love" is the tenth single by Vamps, also the third and last single from album Bloodsuckers released on October 8, 2014. The single reached number 3 on the Oricon chart.

On October 31, 2014, “Vampire's Love” was used for the Japanese version of the blockbuster action film “Dracula ZERO” (also known as “Dracula Untold”)!

In the Japanese release of the album Bloodsuckers, the Japanese version of this song is included meanwhile the single version is included on the international edition of the album released in 2015.

Format 

The single was released in 3 different versions: Limited Edition A (CD+DVD), Limited Edition B (CD+Story Book), and Regular Edition. Limited Edition A come with a DVD containing the PV produced by Nikai Ken and its making video, while Limited Edition B enclose a story book that is linked closely to the PV.

Music video 

Music video for "Vampire's Love" was directed by Ken Nikai and was filmed at London in March 2014.

In the music video, HYDE and K.A.Z act as the vampires. HYDE is the main character which is a vampire who falls in love with a girl who resemble his past girlfriend who died long time ago. Meanwhile, K.A.Z is HYDE's friend who is also a vampire. 3 supported members of Vamps, Ju-ken, Arimatsu & Jin also appear in the music video. Ju-ken plays a role as a victim of HYDE's bloodsucking. Meanwhile, both Arimatsu & Jin play the role of the citizen that appear during HYDE's girl nearly get hit by a car.

Tracklist

DVD (Limited Edition A)
 Vampire's Love -MUSIC VIDEO-
 Vampire's Love -MAKING-

References 

Japanese rock songs
Songs written by Hyde (musician)
2014 songs